Aigle was a 74-gun French ship of the line built at Rochefort in 1800.

In 1805 she sailed to the West Indies with  where they joined a French fleet under Vice-Admiral Villeneuve.

In October 1805, Aigle took part in the Battle of Trafalgar. She was captured during the battle by a boarding party from HMS Defiance.

On the following day, her crew rose up against the British prize crew, and recaptured the ship. However, she was wrecked in the storm of 23 October 1805.

See also
 List of ships captured in the 19th century
 List of ships of the line of France

References

Further reading
 Roche, Jean-Michel, Dictionnaire des Bâtiments de la flotte de guerre française de Colbert à nos jours, Vol.I

Ships of the line of the French Navy
Téméraire-class ships of the line
1800 ships
Captured ships
Napoleonic-era ships
Ships built in France
Maritime incidents in 1805
Shipwrecks of Spain